Spasskoye-Lutovinovo was the childhood estate of Russian writer Ivan Turgenev, which he inherited after his mother's death. It is situated 10 km north of Mtsensk, near Oryol. The house was built in 1778-1809, but was partially destroyed by a fire in May 1839. It was rebuilt in a simpler style.

The estate is now a museum and a natural reserve, open to tourists and visitors. It is designated as an object of Russian cultural heritage of federal significance.

References

Literary museums in Russia
Museums in Oryol Oblast
Historic house museums in Russia
Cultural heritage monuments in Oryol Oblast
Objects of cultural heritage of Russia of federal significance
Tourist attractions in Oryol Oblast
Ivan Turgenev